The 1965 UMass Redmen football team represented the University of Massachusetts Amherst in the 1965 NCAA College Division football season as a member of the Yankee Conference. The team was coached by Vic Fusia and played its home games at Alumni Stadium in Hadley, Massachusetts. The 1965 season was the Redmen's first in Alumni Stadium, their home field until 2012. UMass finished the season with a record of 7–2 overall and 4–1 in conference play.

Schedule

References

UMass
UMass Minutemen football seasons
UMass Redmen football